Demidovsky (masculine), Demidovskaya (feminine), or Demidovskoye (neuter) may refer to:
Demidovsky District, a district of Smolensk Oblast, Russia
Demydivka Raion (Demidovsky District), a district of Rivne Oblast, Ukraine
Demidovskoye Urban Settlement, an administrative division and a municipal formation which the town of Demidov and four rural localities in Demidovsky District of Smolensk Oblast, Russia are incorporated as
Demidovsky (rural locality) (Demidovskaya, Demidovskoye), several rural localities in Russia